Carolyn Powers (born 1920s) is an American former politician in the state of Washington. She served the 26th district from 1979 to 1983. She also served on the Port Orchard, Washington council from 1987 to 2013. Her husband, Paul D. Powers was mayor of Port Orchard from 1972 to 1982.

References

Possibly living people
1920s births
People from Escambia County, Florida
People from Port Orchard, Washington
Washington (state) city council members
Women state legislators in Washington (state)
Democratic Party members of the Washington House of Representatives
Women city councillors in Washington (state)